Ladislavella catascopium is a species of gastropods belonging to the family Lymnaeidae.

The species is found in Northern America.

References

Lymnaeidae
Gastropods described in 1817